The Oxford Clay (or Oxford Clay Formation) is a Jurassic marine sedimentary rock formation underlying much of southeast England, from as far west as Dorset and as far north as Yorkshire. The Oxford Clay Formation dates to the Jurassic, specifically, the Callovian and Oxfordian ages, and comprises two main facies. The lower facies comprises the Peterborough Member, a fossiliferous organic-rich mudstone. This facies and its rocks are commonly known as lower Oxford Clay.  The upper facies comprises the middle Oxford Clay, the Stewartby Member, and the upper Oxford Clay, the Weymouth Member.  The upper facies is a fossil poor assemblage of calcareous mudstones.

Oxford Clay appears at the surface around Oxford, Peterborough  and Weymouth and is exposed in many quarries around these areas. The top of the Lower Oxford Clay shows a lithological change, where fissile shale changes to grey mudstone. The Middle and Upper Oxford Clays differ slightly, as they are separated by an argillaceous limestone in the South Midlands.

Palaeontology 
The Oxford Clay is well known for its rich fossil record of fish and invertebrates. Many of the fossils are well preserved, occasionally some are found exceptionally well preserved. Animals which lived in the Oxford Clay Sea include plesiosaurs, marine crocodiles, ichthyosaurs, cephalopods (such as belemnites), bivalves (such as Gryphaea), and a variety of gastropods. Dinosaur eggs are stratigraphically present in the Lower Oxford Clay. Geographically, they are located in Cambridgeshire, England.

Ornithischians 
Indeterminate euronithopod remains stratigraphically present in the Lower Oxford Clay and geographically located in Cambridgeshire, England.

Saurischians

Plesiosaurs

Pachycormiformes

Thalattosuchians

Economic use 
Oxford Clay has a porous consistency and is soft and is often used in the making of roads. It is also the source of the Fletton stock brick of which much of London is built. For brick making, the Oxford Clay has the advantage of containing carbon which provides part of the fuel required in firing it so reducing the requirement for an external fuel source.

See also 
 List of fossil sites (with link directory)
 List of dinosaur-bearing rock formations
 Kimmeridge Clay
 London Clay
 Weald Clay

References

Bibliography

Further reading 
 Andrews, C. W. 1910. "A Descriptive Catalogue of the Marine Reptiles of the Oxford Clay, Part I". British Museum (Natural History), London, England: 205 pp.
 Andrews, CW. 1913. A descriptive catalogue of the Marine Reptiles of the Oxford Clay, Part II. British Museum (Natural History). pp. 205pp.
 M. J. Benton and P. S. Spencer. 1995. Fossil Reptiles of Great Britain. Chapman & Hall, London 1-386 
 J. B. Delair. 1973. The dinosaurs of Wiltshire. The Wiltshire Archaeological and Natural History Magazine 68:1-7
 P. M. Galton. 1980. European Jurassic ornithopod dinosaurs of the families Hypsilophodontidae and Camptosauridae. Neues Jahrbuch für Geologie und Paläontologie, Abhandlungen 160(1):73-95
 D. M. Martill. 1988. A review of the terrestrial vertebrate of fossils of the Oxford Clay (Callovian-Oxfordian) of England. Mercian Geologist 11(3):171-190

 
Oxfordian Stage
Callovian Stage
Jurassic System of Europe
Shallow marine deposits